is a city located on the Sanriku rias coast in Iwate Prefecture, Japan. , the city had an estimated population of 32,609, and a population density of 74 persons per km2, in 16,230 households. The total area of the city is

Geography
The spectacular, rugged coast of Kamaishi is entirely within the Sanriku Fukkō National Park. There are four large bays, Ōtsuchi Bay in the north, Ryōishi Bay, Kamaishi Bay and Tōni Bay in the south. Each is separated by large, rocky, pine-covered peninsulas which jut out into the Pacific Ocean. Immediately the rocky cliffs develop into hills rising to  along the coast and  farther inland.

The highest point in Kamaishi is Mount Goyōzan in the southwest at 1,341.3 meters in elevation. Most of the land is mountainous, allowing for little agriculture. The main rivers are the Kasshigawa River which empties into Kamaishi Bay and the Unosumai River which empties into Ōtsuchi Bay. Both have small floodplains that allow for development and agriculture.

Neighboring municipalities
Iwate Prefecture
Ōtsuchi to the north
Tōno to the west
Sumita to the west
Ōfunato to the south

Climate
Kamaishi has a humid subtropical climate (Köppen Cfa) characterized by mild summers and cold winters.  The average annual temperature in Kamaishi is 10.1 °C. The average annual rainfall is 1453 mm with September as the wettest month and February as the driest month. The temperatures are highest on average in August, at around 22.5 °C, and lowest in January, at around -0.8 °C.

Demographics
Per Japanese census data, the population of Kamaishi peaked in around the year 1960 has declined steadily over the past 60 years.

History

Pre-Meiji Kamaishi
The area of present-day Kamaishi was part of ancient Mutsu Province, and has been settled since at least the Jōmon period. The area was inhabited by the Emishi people, and came under the control of the Yamato dynasty during the early Heian period. During the Sengoku period, the area was dominated by various samurai clans before coming under the control of the Nambu clan during the Edo period, who ruled Morioka Domain under the Tokugawa shogunate. Before the discovery of magnetite in 1727, Kamaishi was little different from any of the other small fishing communities along the coast. However, it was not until 1857, and the construction of the first small blast furnace, that any real changes could be seen. In the 1850s, the feudal domains of Japan were engaged in an arms race to develop the first Western-style armaments, particularly large guns. The Nanbu Domain constructed blast furnaces of a foreign design in Kamaishi under the direction of military engineer Takatō Ōshima. Ten furnaces were built in all but some were owned by private corporations. The first of these furnaces was lit on December 1, 1857; a day honored as the start of modern iron production in Japan.

Early modern Kamaishi
In the Meiji period establishment of the modern municipalities system, the town of Kamaishi was established within Minamihei District, Iwate on April 1, 1889. Minamihei and Nishihei Districts merged to form Kamihei District in 1896. Kamaishi attained city status on May 5, 1937, and expanded in 1955 with the absorption of the neighboring villages of Kasshi, Unosumai, Kurihashi from Kamihei District and the village of Tōni from Kesen District.

In 1875, the newly established Meiji government bought all of the furnaces and created the Kamaishi Iron Works. They also put Ōshima and a German engineer in charge of its modernization. The German director imported two large steam-driven blast furnaces of the latest design from Britain and set up a railway with 15 miles of track and a locomotive purchased from Manchester to deliver the ore. Production began in 1880 but had to be stopped soon after due to a lack of charcoal. An attempt to resume operations in 1882 by replacing charcoal with coke failed and the plant was closed.

There were cholera outbreaks in Kamaishi in July 1882 and April 1884. The first left 302 people dead and warnings about the drinking water were posted throughout the prefecture.

In 1885, a new foundry was established which used coal from Hokkaido and iron ore from China.

The 1896 Sanriku earthquake struck on June 15 at 7:32 pm while families were celebrating Boy's Festival on the beach. The earthquake measured magnitude 8.5 while the tsunami on the Iwate coast reached as high as 24 meters in places – the highest ever recorded in Japan at the time. The city of Kamaishi was completely destroyed. The French Catholic missionary Henri Lispard was also swept out to sea and died when the wave struck.

Kamaishi in WWII
As an important foundry town, Kamaishi played a significant role in the Japanese war effort and was targeted by the U.S. Navy during World War II. This was the first naval bombardment of the Japanese mainland. Rear Admiral John F. Shafroth Jr.'s battleships and cruisers, joined by two Royal Navy light cruisers, attacked again on 9 August. The mill was also the site of the Sendai Prisoner of War Camp, and 32 Allied prisoners were killed in the raids. A second naval bombardment followed on 8 August, specifically targeting the civilian portion the city. A total of 694 civilians and 30 Japanese military personnel were killed in the bombardment.

Kamaishi after WWII
Kamaishi played its part in Japan's post-war boom, continuing its reputation as a steel town, a reputation reflected in the name of its rugby team - the Kaminashi Nippon Steel Rugby Club. In 1960, the town was crippled by a tsunami generated by the 1960 Valdivia earthquake. However, following the closure of the steel mills in 1988, the economy of city collapsed, and almost half its population moved away. Kamaishi is now known more for commercial fishing than heavy industry. On September 30, 2010, Foreign Policy magazine used Kamaishi as an example of Japan's relative decline in the "Lost Decade".

2011 Tōhoku earthquake and tsunami
Kamaishi was heavily damaged by the 2011 Tōhoku earthquake and tsunami, in which 1,250 city residents were killed or are missing; at least 4 of the town's 69 designated evacuation sites and three of the town's 14 schools were inundated. Of the 2,900 students who attended the town's schools, five elementary or junior high school students were killed or are missing.

It was once recognized by the Guinness World Records as the world's deepest breakwater. The subsequent decision to rebuild the breakwater at a cost of over $650 million was criticised as "a waste of money that aims to protect an area of rapidly declining population with technology that is a proven failure".

Numerous news videos were broadcast of the city, which can be recognized by a large green crane in the background and water rushing against tall buildings at the edge of the city.

Government
Kamaishi has a mayor-council form of government with a directly elected mayor and a unicameral city legislature of 19 members. Kamaishi, together with the town of Ōtsuchi collectively contributes two seats to the Iwate Prefectural legislature. In terms of national politics, the city is part of Iwate 2nd district of the lower house of the Diet of Japan.

Economy
Kamaishi was famous in modern times for its steel production, although after the closure of the blast furnace at Nippon Steel Kamaishi Iron and Steel Works and the scaling down of production in 1989, the local economy suffered greatly.  The city has most recently made strong efforts towards promotion of eco-tourism. In 2015, the Hashino iron mining and smelting site was accepted as a UNESCO World Heritage Site as part of the Sites of Japan's Meiji Industrial Revolution: Iron and Steel, Shipbuilding and Coal Mining. Commercial fishing and shellfish production are also important economic activities.

Education
Kamaishi has nine public elementary schools, five public junior high schools operated by the city board of education, and three public high schools operated by the Iwate Prefectural Board of Education. The prefecture also operates one special education school for the handicapped.

Sports
Kamaishi was the home to one of Japan's most successful rugby union clubs, Nippon Steel Kamaishi, which existed from 1959 to 2001 and won several national titles during the 1970s and 1980s. The club was succeeded by the modern Kamaishi Seawaves. As part of the post-disaster recovery of the region, Kamaishi hosted part of the 2019 Rugby World Cup at a new stadium holding 16,000 spectators.

Kamaishi won the "Award for Character" of the Rugby World Cup 2019 awards.

The city also has a semi-professional association football club, Nippon Steel Corp. Kamaishi S.C., which plays in the 5th division Tohoku Soccer League.

Transportation

Railway
 East Japan Railway Company (JR East) - Kamaishi Line
  -  -  -  - 
Sanriku Railway – Rias Line
  -  -

Highway

Port
Port of Kamaishi

Local attractions
Sanriku Fukkō National Park
Hashino iron mining and smelting site, a UNESCO World Heritage Site

International relations
 Digne-les-Bains, France since April 20, 1994

Noted people from Kamaishi
Yu Suzuki, video game creator
Katsuhiko Takahashi, writer
Toshiya Miura, professional soccer manager
Makoto Sawaguchi, professional basketball player

References

External links

 Official Website 
 The 2011 Tsunami pouring over Kamaishi's Harbour Wall

 
Cities in Iwate Prefecture
Port settlements in Japan
Populated coastal places in Japan